Richard Henry Seward (October 10, 1840 – May 30, 1899) was a Union Navy sailor in the American Civil War who received the U.S. military's highest decoration, the Medal of Honor.

Seward was born on October 10, 1840, in Kittery Point, Maine, to a family of mariners.

At Ship Island Sound, Louisiana, on November 23, 1863, Seward recovered the bodies of two soldiers despite heavy fire. For this action, he was awarded the Medal of Honor five months later on April 16, 1864.

He was a Companion of the Massachusetts Commandery of the Naval Order of the United States.

Seward died on May 30, 1899, at age 58 and was buried at First Christian Church Cemetery in Kittery Point, Maine, under the name "Richard H. Seaward".

Medal of Honor citation 
Seward's official Medal of Honor citation reads:

 Rank and organization: Paymaster's Steward, U.S. Navy
 Place and date: Ship Island Sound, La., 23 November 1863
 Date of issue: 16 April 1864

Served as paymaster's steward on board the U.S.S. Commodore, November 1863. Carrying out his duties courageously, Seward "volunteered to go on the field amidst a heavy fire to recover the bodies of 2 soldiers which he brought off with the aid of others; a second instance of personal valor within a fortnight.'' Promoted to acting master's mate.

Notes

References 

1840 births
1899 deaths
People from Kittery, Maine
People of Maine in the American Civil War
Union Navy sailors
United States Navy Medal of Honor recipients
American Civil War recipients of the Medal of Honor